Frédéric Lenoir (born 3 June 1962) is a French sociologist, philosopher and writer

Biography
Lenoir studied philosophy at the University of Fribourg followed by a PhD on Buddhism and the West at the  School for Advanced Studies in the Social Sciences. His first two novels – The Angel's Promise (2004, with Violette Cabesos) and The Oracle of the Moon (2006) – sold more than a million copies in twenty countries.

Awards 
 Prix Maison de la Presse (2004, with Violette Cabesos)

References

External links
 

1962 births
Living people
French sociologists
French philosophers
University of Fribourg alumni
School for Advanced Studies in the Social Sciences alumni